The Alex was a prototype light car produced by Alexander and Co., Edinburgh, in 1908. The sole car made utilized a 14/18 hp 4-cylinder Gnome engine and a Rubery Owen chassis. Production was stopped after the solitary prototype, after costs were found to be too great.

See also
 List of car manufacturers of the United Kingdom

References
^Bill Emery, "Ales", in G.N. Georgano, ed., The Complete Encyclopedia of Motorcars 1885-1968  (New York: E.P. Dutton and Co., 1974), pp. 33.

Defunct motor vehicle manufacturers of Scotland
Companies based in Edinburgh
1908 in Scotland
History of Edinburgh
Car manufacturers of the United Kingdom